The Medal for Noble Deeds is a Danish medal awarded to recognize the saving of a life at great risk to the rescuer and the rescued.

History
The Medal for Noble Deeds was established 12 June 1793 by King Christian VII at the suggestion of the Finance Collegium.  It is currently administered by the Ministry of Justice. The Medal is rarely awarded, and in 2011 there were 8 living recipients. On September 25, 2015, the Medal was awarded to three women and a man for heroic deeds at the Præstø Fjord accident on February 11, 2011.

References

External links
 Medaljen for ædel Dåd (The medal for noble deeds)
 Kongelige medaljer og tegn (Royal medals and signs)

Orders, decorations, and medals of Denmark